Taxat-Senat is a commune in the Allier department in Auvergne-Rhône-Alpes in central France.

Population

Economy
In 2007, the working age population was 120 people, 96 were active and 24 were inactive. 92 of the 96 active people (49 men and 43 women) were employed and 4 (1 man and 3 women) unemployed. Of the 24, 8 inactive people were retired, 6 were students and 10 were classified as "other inactive".

In 2009 there were 84 tax units making up 218 individuals, and the median annual income tax per person was €16,102.5.

In 2007, 12 establishments existed in the commune, including a food company, a manufacturer, a construction company and an auto repair firm and service companies. In 2000, the commune had 22 farms covering a total of 1274 hectares.

Sights
The commune contains the Église romane Saint-André de Taxat, dated to the twelfth century with rich frescoes of the fourteenth century. It is listed on the Supplementary List of Historic Monuments and is partly ruined, especially the floor of the nave and is subject to a restoration plan. The other church, Église de Senat, the parish church, has an apse and bell tower which are also on Supplementary List of Historic Monuments.

Personalities
Hubert Pradon-Vallancy (1891-1943), Deputy of the Allier Department from 1928 to 1932. He was born in the Château de Mont in Taxat-Senat and was also mayor of Taxat-Senat.

See also
Communes of the Allier department

References

Communes of Allier